Acalolepta longipennis is a species of beetle in the family Cerambycidae. It was described by Charles Joseph Gahan in 1894. It is known from Papua New Guinea.

References

Acalolepta
Beetles described in 1894